The Parliamentary Constituencies Act 1986 (c. 56) is an Act of the Parliament of the United Kingdom. It is the  legislation defining the constitution and work of the four parliamentary Boundary Commissions in the UK. A copy of the current text of the legislation, incorporating all current amendments, is available from the legislation section of the Boundary Commission for Scotland website.

The 1986 Act consolidated earlier legislation, namely the House of Commons (Redistribution of Seats) Act 1949 and the Acts of the same name of 1958 and 1979.

Amendment
The 1986 Act has been amended by the Boundary Commissions Act 1992, and by various other statutes, and remains in force. In February 2011, the Parliamentary Voting System and Constituencies Act 2011 received Royal Assent. It contains substantial amendments to the 1986 Act. The changes affected the Sixth Periodic Review of Westminster constituencies which provides for a review to be laid before Parliament that contains 50 fewer constituencies and less variation in electorates. It also provides for more frequent boundary reviews and a small reduction in the length of the consultation period.

References

External links

United Kingdom Acts of Parliament 1986
Constituencies of the Parliament of the United Kingdom
1986 in British politics
Acts of the Parliament of the United Kingdom concerning Northern Ireland